Joshua Bruns (born March 5, 1993) is an American professional wrestler, better known by his ring name Josh Briggs. He is currently signed to WWE where he performs on the NXT brand. In WWE, he is a one-time NXT UK Tag Team Champion with Brooks Jensen, and he and Jensen are recognized as the final holders of the championship. He previously appeared for Evolve, where he was the final Evolve Champion.

Early life
Bruns played football at UMass after two years at Glendale Community College in Arizona.

Professional wrestling career
On August 31, 2020, it was reported that Briggs had signed a contract with WWE, following the company's purchase of Evolve in July. On October 7, WWE announced that he had reported for training at the Performance Center, alongside five other professional wrestlers from Evolve. On July 6, 2021, Briggs was announced to be a part of the 2021 NXT Breakout Tournament. On the July 27 episode of NXT, Briggs was defeated by Carmelo Hayes in the first round. On the NXT 2.0 premiere on September 14, Briggs formed a tag team with the debuting Brooks Jensen and faced Imperium (Fabian Aichner and Marcel Barthel) in a losing effort, establishing themselves as faces. On the January 18, 2022 episode of NXT, Briggs and Jensen competed in the Dusty Rhodes Men's Tag Team Classic, but were eliminated by eventual winners the Creed Brothers (Brutus and Julius) in the first round. On the April 12 episode of NXT, they took part in a five-team gauntlet match for the vacant NXT Tag Team Championship, but failed to win. On the June 22 episode of NXT UK, Briggs and Jensen defeated Dave Mastiff and Jack Starz, Mark Andrews and Wild Boar, and Die Familie (Teoman and Rohan Raja) in a Fatal 4-Way elimination match to win the vacant NXT UK Tag Team Championship, making them the first and only non-European tag team to win the titles.

Championships and accomplishments
Alpha-1 Wrestling
A1 Zero Gravity Championship (1 time)
Chaotic Wrestling
Chaotic Wrestling New England Championship (1 time)
Chaotic Wrestling New England Title Tournament (2017)
 Evolve
 Evolve Championship (1 time)
Monster Factory Pro Wrestling
MFPW Network Championship (1 time)
Northeast Championship Wrestling
Ox Baker Memorial Cup (2017)
Pro Wrestling Illustrated
Ranked No. 175 of the top 500 singles wrestlers in the PWI 500 in 2020
UFO Wrestling
UFO Tag Team Championship (1 time) - with Beau Douglas
WWE
NXT UK Tag Team Championship (1 time, final) – with Brooks Jensen

References

External links

1993 births
21st-century professional wrestlers
American male professional wrestlers
Living people
NXT UK Tag Team Champions
Professional wrestlers from Massachusetts
UMass Minutemen football players